Novgorod is a weekly newspaper published in Veliky Novgorod, Russia. It was founded on October 19, 1990.  The newspaper comes out on Thursdays and has a circulation of 103,000.

As of 2021, the editor-in-chief is Людмила Соколова.

External links
Official website

Publications established in 1990
Russian-language newspapers published in Russia
Novgorod Oblast
Veliky Novgorod